Mónica Fechino Wilson (born 18 February 1967) is an Argentine windsurfer. She competed in the women's one design mistral event at the 1996 Summer Olympics.

References

1967 births
Living people
Sportspeople from Buenos Aires
Argentine female sailors (sport)
Argentine windsurfers
Olympic sailors of Argentina
Sailors at the 1996 Summer Olympics – Mistral One Design
Female windsurfers